Albanian heraldry is the use of heraldic symbols in Albania. The earliest form of Albanian heraldry is from the late 12th century, with the creation of the first Albanian medieval country, the Principality of Arbanon in 1190. During the 13th to the 15th century, a great number of medieval Albanian noble families had at their coat of arms the symbol of eagle like the Kastrioti, Muzaka, Arianiti, Dukagjini, but the most prominent being the Kastrioti's coat of arms, having a black double headed eagle, which became a national symbol of the Albanians during Skanderbeg's reign in the 15th century, as well as the official national flag of Albania from 1912.

The discipline of heraldry has its roots in 11th century Europe, at the same time that regulations emerged on the display of military guns, seals and feudal flags by empires and military coalitions.

The most prominent symbol of the Albanian heraldry is the eagle.

History
The well known Croatian researcher Milan Šufflay, who specialized in Albanian studies, wrote: "In the Albanian lands, heraldry was used early in ceremonies and chancelleries...since their contacts with the Anjou and the French knights..."

The heraldic emblem of Arbanon (Arbër) was discovered in Gëziq (Mirditë) and dates from the 12th century. It was set on an architectural ensemble of artistic values and written in Latin, considered the language of nobility at the time. The early emblem of the Muzaka was discovered during the same period and it displays a water stream with two torches on each side. The family later adopted a bicephalic Eagle as base.

Over the centuries, heraldry had been widely used not only by wealthy individuals and princes but also by cities, state institutions, religious and artisanal societies, etc. Albania had a development of heraldry in all forms. From medieval times, there are different samples and continuous changes of emblems based on the creation of new coalitions and marriages.

When Andrea Topia got married, the emblem of his seal changed by including the symbols of the French Kingdom, to which he became the groom. Acknowledging the despot title, the House of Muzaka, made use of the Byzantine Empire symbols, the two-headed eagle to which it was added the 6 pointed star of the Balsha family, whom it was dependent. In this line, the grandson of Skanderbeg, who joined the church hierarchy, added a triangle to the inherited symbols of the House of Kastrioti emblem, which stands for the holy trinity and also made some changes to its color scheme.

Heraldry also developed from the influence of the Albanian folk symbols and is found in many materials and cultural objects together with the myths, cults and ritual explanations.

The 14th century heraldic seal of the Topia was preserved at the monastery of Saint John Vladimir in Elbasan (collection of the National History Museum, Tirana) and it is produced according to all heraldry regulations of the time. It is carved from the local master Dhimitër Spada and it is accompanied by a writing in 3 languages: Latin, Greek and Slavic, showing that the herald of this noble Albanian family was a very well known artist. The seal is the highest level of artistic development in heraldry because new elements were introduced according to a defined regulation. The unification of these decorative-artistic elements was the seal.

In Medieval times, noble families also had their flags similar to the heraldry emblems. On the eve of the League of Lezhë on March 2, 1444, the people unified and recognized the flag of the House of Kastrioti as their flag. Following centuries of occupation by the Ottoman Empire, the cultural identity of the people in this region suffered a shock, and its influence on heraldry left a mark. Today, Albanian heraldry in general consists of a mix of traditional Heraldry as well as Socialist Heraldry.

See also
Flag of Albania
List of Albanian flags
Armorial of Albania
Coat of arms of Albania
Flag of Kosovo
List of flags of Kosovo
Emblem of Kosovo

References